Nicolás Guzmán Bustamante (1850–February 12, 1928) was a Chilean painter and draftsman. His art is categorized as romanticism and realism.

Biography 

Guzmán Bustamante, started off as a sculptor and continued as a painter. He was an outstanding student of Antonio Smith and Alejandro Ciccarelli. From a young age, he dedicated himself to painting and at 25 years old he participated in the Chilean International Exhibition of 1875. He was also noted for having done deep studies on artistic anatomy, always excelling in realistic artistic compositions.

The oil on canvas called Hundimiento de la Esmeralda con sus tripulantes en el Combate Naval de Iquique (The Sinking of Emeralda with its crew in the Naval Combat of Iquique), painted in 1882; won first medal and the second prize for oil on canvas called La muerte de Pedro de Valdivia (The death of Pedro de Valdivia).His pictures, where he stood out thanks to his discrete coloring and historical correctness. His impeccable drawing allowed him to distribute the characters in the rectangle of the canvas with masterly plastic wisdom.

Hundimiento de la Esmeralda con sus tripulantes en el Combate Naval de Iquique was destroyed by the earthquake of 1906 Valparaíso, that caused a fire at the Victoria Theater where this artistic work was exhibited.

Exhibitions

Works in public collections 

Collectibles National Museum of Fine ArtsNaval Combat of Iquique, 1882, oil on wood, 31 x 50 cm. On loan to the National Historical Museum since 1975
Pinacoteca of the Military School of SantiagoBattle of Bleed, oil on canvas
National Historical Museum of Santiago de ChileFirst Government Board, 1889, oil on canvas

Awards and Distinctions 

 1872 Honorable Mention. National Exhibition of Arts and Industries, Mercado Central Santiago, Chile.
 1884 Second Prize, Annual Hall, Santiago, Chile.
 1889 First place medal, Annual Hall, Santiago, Chile.Hundimiento de la Esmeralda   
 1981 Chilean Painting Rescue, Cultural Institute of Providencia, Santiago.

See also 
 Pascual Ortega Portales
 Alberto Orrego Luco
 Álvaro Casanova Zenteno
 Eugenio Cruz Vargas

Bibliography 

ÁLVAREZ URQUIETA, LUIS. Painting in Chile Luis Álvarez Urquieta Collection. Santiago, 1928.
BENEZIT, E. Dictionaire Critique et Documentaire des Peintres, Sculpteurs, Dessinateurs et Graveurs 9th Paris: Librairie Gründ, 1976.
MNBA LIBRARY AND INFORMATION CENTER. Documentary Archive of the Artist Eugenio Guzmán Ovalle.
BINDIS, RICARDO. Chilean Painting: From Gil de Castro to the present day. Santiago: Editorial Philips Chilena, 1980.
BINDIS, RICARDO. Chilean painting, Two Hundred Years. Santiago: Origo Ediciones, 2006.
CLEAR TOCORNAL, REGINA. The Representation of Poverty in Chilean Art, a First Approach. Santiago: Annals of the Chile Institute. Vol. XXVI, 2007.
MANAGEMENT, VICENTE. Encyclopedia of Art in America: Biographies. Buenos Aires: OMEBA Editions, 1968.
CULTURAL INSTITUTE OF PROVIDENCE. Chilean painting rescue. Text by José María Palacios. Santiago, 1981.
PEREIRA SALAS, EUGENIO. Studies on the History of Art in Republican Chile. Santiago: Editions of the University of Chile, 1992.

Gallery

References

1850 births
1928 deaths
19th-century Chilean painters
19th-century Chilean male artists
Chilean male artists
20th-century Chilean painters
19th-century war artists
20th-century war artists
Chilean war artists
People from Santiago
Chilean people of Spanish descent
Chilean male painters
Male painters
20th-century Chilean male artists